Gérardmer (or archaic Geroldsee, and Giraumoué in local Vosgian) is a commune in the Vosges Department, Grand Est (before 2016: Lorraine), France.

Geography
Historically it has been the chief summer resort of the French Vosges and was a centre for excursions, including to the summit of the Hohneck and the Schlucht, which is a mountain pass from France to Germany.

Population

Culture
The Festival international du film fantastique de Gérardmer (literally Gérardmer International Festival of fantastic film, formerly named 'Fantastic'Arts' from 1994 to 2008) is an international festival of horror and fantastic films which has been held each year since 1994 in Gérardmer.

Notable people 
 Maximilien Kelsch (1844–1906), industrialist and politician, born in Gérardmer
 Paul Cuny (1872–1925), industrialist and politician, born in Gérardmer
 Edward Gardère (1909–1997), fencer, born in Gérardmer
 André Gardère (1913–1977), fencer, born in Gérardmer
 Gilberte Cournand (1913–2005), journalist and dance critic, gallery owner and bookseller, born in Gérardmer
 Claude Vanony (1935), storyteller and humorist, born in Gérardmer
 Patrick Rémy (1965), cross-country skier, born in Gérardmer
 Raphaël Dargent (1970), historian, essayist and writer, born in Gérardmer
 Julien Bontemps (1979), sailor, learnt to sail in Gérardmer
 Maxime Laheurte (1985), world nordic combined team champion (2012), born in Gérardmer
 Émile Duguet, Righteous Among the Nations, concealed Jews at his home in Gérardmer

Twin towns
 Le Locle, Switzerland
 Tidermène, Mali
 Waremme''', Belgium

See also
Communes of the Vosges department

References

External links

 

Communes of Vosges (department)
Vosges communes articles needing translation from French Wikipedia